Aparecido is a Brazilian surname, may refer to:
Ademar Aparecido Xavier Júnior, commonly known as Ademar, Brazilian footballer
César Aparecido Rodrigues, commonly known as César, Brazilian footballer born 1974
Gilberto Aparecido da Silva, commonly known as Gilberto Silva, Brazilian footballer born 1976
Johnathan Aparecido da Silva, commonly known as Johnathan, Brazilian footballer born 1990
Wilson Aparecido Xavier Júnior, commonly known as Juninho, Brazilian footballer born 1984
Leonardo José Aparecido Moura, commonly known as Leonardo,  Brazilian footballer born 1986
Ronaldo Aparecido Rodrigues, commonly known as Naldo, Brazilian footballer born 1982
Pedro Aparecido Santana, commonly known as Pedrinho, Brazilian footballer
Rodrigo Thiago Aparecido da Silva
As given name
Aparecido Francisco de Lima, commonly known as Lima, Brazilian footballer born 1981
Aparecido Donizetti, Brazilian footballer

External links
wikt:en:Aparecido